Sakib "Šako" Polumenta  (born 27 March 1968) is a Montenegrin pop-folk singer popular throughout the former Yugoslav republics.

Personal and early life
Polumenta was born into a Bosniak family in Bijelo Polje, a municipality of northern Montenegro (then part of Yugoslavia).

He is married with Vesna, whom he has been in a relationship for 15 years (as of 2013).

He has a daughter, Rijalda (b. 1989), who married in 2012.

He is the paternal uncle of well-known singer Dado Polumenta, whose career he helped launch.

At early stage of his career he used to sing in Serbian Ekavian dialect which was uncommon for his homeland Montenegro but that made him gain wide popularity.

Career
He began his career in 1993. He has several housings in Podgorica, Belgrade, Ulcinj. He is often singing in the Belgrade splav (river boat) "River".

Šakib becomes more famous after sex scandal where he had relationship with younger woman where media researched that she was 16 years old, at that time. It was a huge scandal where he almost lost his career as a pedophile. Later on he was published in Serbian and Montenegrin media as very sloppy singer when his rented apartment was left with garbage in front of his doors for 4 days. He began insulting his neighbours for that, but later on he cleaned the building and garbage.

Discography
Studio albums
 Ej, sudbino (1993)
 Daj meni grešniku (1995)
 U ljubavi svi su grešni (1997)
 Aman, aman (1999)
 Od ljubavi oslepeo (2000)
 Dišem za tebe (2002)
 Uvijek blizu (2004)
 Karta za budućnost (2006)
 Sanjao sam san... (2008)
 Heroj... (2011)
 Sve je samo tren (2015)

As featured artist
 Gde god pođem tebi idem (2006) with Stoja on her album, Metak

References

External links
 

1968 births
Living people
People from Bijelo Polje
Montenegrin folk singers
Grand Production artists
21st-century Montenegrin male singers
20th-century Montenegrin male singers
Bosniaks of Montenegro